Ian Sturrock is a rescuer and restorer of orchards and apple trees, saving apple varieties from extinction.  He discovered the last remaining Bardsey apple, and rescued the Diamond apple, as well as many other Welsh apples.

He was a finalist for a 2016 St David Award.

References

External links
  the Bardsey apple (afal enlli)

Living people
Year of birth missing (living people)